Sylvirana montosa is a frog in the family Ranidae.  It is endemic to Vietnam, Cambodia and Laos.

Scientists place this frog in the same species group as Sylvirana mortenseni.

References

montosa
Frogs of Asia